Shadows of the Last War is an adventure module for the 3.5 edition of the Dungeons & Dragons fantasy role-playing game.

Plot summary
Shadows of the Last War takes place in the Eberron setting. Agents of the Emerald Claw seek to obtain the secrets to constructing a terrible magic weapon from the ruined House Cannith citadel of Whitehearth.

Publication history
Shadows of the Last War was written by Keith Baker, and was published in July 2004. Cover art was by Wayne Reynolds, with interior art by Tommy Castillo.

Reception
Dungeon Master for Dummies lists Shadows of the Last War as one of the ten best 3rd edition adventures.

References

External links
 product info

Eberron adventures
Role-playing game supplements introduced in 2004